HaArba'a Street (The Four street) is a famous commercial street in central Tel Aviv, Israel. It was named after four members of the Haganah that were killed there in 1946 in an attack on nearby British Police that was nearby. 

The street begins in the "Tel Aviv Cinematheque plaza" named by officer – policeman Shmuel Weizman and ending by Begin Road in Sarona, until the Cinematheque was established in 1989 the square by the start of the street was triangular. Route of the road was the southern border of the German Colony Sarona in the north to the present to a number of houses Templars.  Houses closest to the street were built later, in proportion to the rest of village houses, and they have the international style that most new houses were built of Tel Aviv in the 1930s, before abandoning the colony.  Today the street is part of the business square in Tel Aviv and is analogous to the business of Hahashmonaim and is part of the South Campus.  Part of this project have been built so far at the eastern end of the street, late '90s, three office towers − Millennium Tower, Tower East, Platinum Tower and beside them a unique structure of the plant matter of IEC.  With companies located in the towers are among Israel Corp., Israel Chemicals and KPMG. tower East state Comptroller office is located. Millennium Tower Restaurant is the home of chef Aviv Moshe.  The street is "Templar winery" near the German Colony – Templar "Sharona" designed to make the market structure.  This street offices also located in the center of local government in Israel.

References 
 The information in this article is based on that in its Hebrew equivalent.

External links 

Streets in Tel Aviv